Robert Turnbull (17 December 1895 – 18 March 1952) was an English international footballer, who played as an outside right.

Career
Born in Middlesbrough, Turnbull played professionally for Bradford Park Avenue, before joining Leeds United in 1925 and earned one cap for England in 1919.

References

1895 births
1952 deaths
English footballers
England international footballers
Bradford (Park Avenue) A.F.C. players
English Football League players
Association football forwards